Kosmos 12 ( meaning Cosmos 12) or Zenit-2 No.6 was a Soviet optical film-return reconnaissance satellite launched in 1962. A Zenit-2 spacecraft, Kosmos 12 was the seventh of eighty-one such satellites to be launched.

Spacecraft
Kosmos 12 was a Zenit-2 satellite, a first generation, low resolution, reconnaissance satellite derived from the Vostok spacecraft used for crewed flights, the satellites were developed by OKB-1. In addition to reconnaissance, it was also used for research into radiation in support of the Vostok programme.

Mission
The Vostok-2 rocket, serial number T15000-10, was used to launch Kosmos 12. The launch took place from Site 1/5 at the Baikonur Cosmodrome at 09:21:00 GMT on 22 December 1962. Following its successful arrival in orbit, the spacecraft received its Kosmos designation, along with the Harvard designation 1962 Beta Omega 1, the International Designator 1962-072A, and the Satellite Catalog Number 00517.

Kosmos 12 was operated in a low Earth orbit. On 30 December 1962, the spacecraft was deorbited, with its return capsule descending by parachute for recovery by the Soviet forces in the steppe in Kazakhstan.

See also

 1962 in spaceflight

References

Spacecraft launched in 1962
Kosmos satellites
Spacecraft which reentered in 1962
Zenit-2 satellites